DeBevoise is a surname, probably related to the French city of Beauvais.

People 
Charles I. DeBevoise, (1872-1958), US General 
Dickinson R. Debevoise, (1924-2015), United States District Judge 
Eli Whitney Debevoise, (1899-1990), New York lawyer, founder Debevoise & Plimpton
Eli Whitney Debevoise II, (1953), former director of the World Bank Group
Thomas M. Debevoise, (1929-1995),  Vermont Attorney General
William H. DeBevoise, (1826-1886), Union Army officer

Other 
Debevoise & Plimpton, New York City law firm

References

French-language surnames
Surnames of French origin